The FIU Panthers represent Florida International University (FIU) in Miami, Florida. The Panthers are an NCAA FBS college football team in Conference USA led by Mike MacIntyre and play at the on-campus FIU Stadium.

This is a list of their annual results.

Seasons 

 

†† 2003 season (2 wins), 2004 season (3 wins), and 2005 (5 overall wins, 3 conference wins) season wins vacated due to NCAA sanctions.

References

FIU Panthers

FIU Panthers football seasons